Charles Niven (1845–1923) was a Scottish mathematician and physicist who spent most of his career at the University of Aberdeen.  He published on mechanic, electricity and heat.

Life and work 
Charles Niven studied mathematics at Aberdeen and was awarded a BA in 1863, and then studied at Cambridge. Charles and his older brother William D. were tutored by Edward Routh for the Mathematical Tripos. Charles became senior wrangler in 1867.

In 1867, Niven was appointed Prof of Mathematics at Queen's College Cork, in Ireland a position that George Boole had previously occupied.

From 1880, Niven was professor of Natural Philosophy in the University of Aberdeen, and he was responsible for establishing the Physics Department in the Marischal College in 1906. He retired at the end of 1922.

Charles Niven was a Fellow of the Royal Society from 1880 and honorary member of the Edinburgh Mathematical Society from 1883.

References

Bibliography

External links 
 
 Charles Niven's Grave at Banchory-Devenick

19th-century Scottish mathematicians
20th-century Scottish mathematicians
1845 births
1923 deaths